Margit Magnusdóttir Kwao (née Magnusdóttir; born 26 February 1992) is a Faroese footballer who plays as a midfielder. She has been a member of the Faroe Islands women's national team. She is married to Miðvágs Bóltfelag midfielder Solomon A. Kwao, originally from Ghana, whom she has two children with.

References

1992 births
Living people
Women's association football midfielders
Faroese women's footballers
People from Miðvágur
Faroe Islands women's youth international footballers
Faroe Islands women's international footballers
Faroese people of Icelandic descent